Nuflow may refer to:
Nu Flow Technologies
Nu-Flow the debut album from British R&B band Big Brovaz
Nu Flow, a single from this album